A marine protected area (MPA) is a protected area that includes primarily marine environment and biodiversity.

The International Union for Conservation of Nature (IUCN) defines a protected area as: 
"A clearly defined geographical space, recognised, dedicated and managed, through legal or other effective means, to achieve the long-term conservation of nature with associated ecosystem services and cultural values."
This definition is intended to make it more difficult to claim MPA status for regions where exploitation of marine resources occurs. If there is no defined long-term goal for conservation and ecological recovery and extraction of marine resources occurs, a region is not a marine protected area.

As of June 2019 there are 14,830 marine protected areas with a total area of  representing 7.59% of the ocean.

Africa

Mozambique
 , 1971,

South Africa

The listed MPAs were individually proclaimed. Some were later consolidated with adjacent MPAs and may not still be generally referred to by the original name.
 , (2019), 
 , (2019),  
 , (2019), 
 , (2019), 
 , (2004), 
 , (2019), integrated with Aliwal Shoal MPA
 , (2019), 
 , (2019), 
 , (2000), 
 , (2004),
 , (2019), 
 , (2019), 
 Castle Rock Marine Protected Area, previously known as the Millers Point Marine Reserve, now part of Table Mountain National Park Marine Protected Area (2000)
 , (2019), 
 , (2000), 
 , (2000), 
 , (2000), 
 , (2000), 
 , (2000), 
  (KwaZulu-Natal) 
 , (2019), 
 , (2000), 
 , (2000), 
 , (2000), 
 , (2000), 
 , (Western Cape) 
 , (2019), 
 , (2019), 
 , (2019), 
 , (2004), 
 , (2019), 
 , (2013), 
 , (2019), 
 , (2019), 
 , (2000), 
 , (2000), 
 , (2000), 
 , (2019), 
 , (2019), 
 , (2008), 
 , (2004), 
 , (2000), 
 , (2000), 
 , (2019), 
 , (2001, seasonal),

Antarctica
Ross Sea Region Marine Protected Area,

Asia

Thailand
 , 1981, . IUCN Category II.
 , 1981, . IUCN Category II.
 , 1983, IUCN Category II.
 , 1981, . IUCN Category II.
 , 1966, . IUCN Category II.
 , 1983, . IUCN Category II.
 , 1980, . IUCN Category II.
 , 1982, . IUCN Category II.
 , 1990, . IUCN Category II.
 , 1984, . IUCN Category II.
 , 1982, . IUCN Category II.
 , 1981, . IUCN Category II.
 , 1976, . IUCN Category II.

Australia
, (2012), 

, 

, (2018), ,IUCN category VI

, (2018),  ,IUCN category VI

, (2018), IUCN category VI
, (1983), IUCN category Ia.

 (2000) , IUCN category Ia
, (2018), IUCN category VI

, (2018), IUCN category IV
, (2018), IUCN category VI
, (1991), IUCN category II

, (1987), IUCN category IV

, (2018), IUCN category IV
, (2007), UCN category II

, (2018), ,IUCN category IV
, (2018), IUCN category IV

, (2007), IUCN category VI
, (2007), IUCN category VI
, (2007), IUCN category VI
, (2007), IUCN category VI
, (2007), IUCN category II
, (2007), IUCN category VI
, (2007), IUCN category II
, (2007), IUCN category VI
, (1999), IUCN category IV
, (2007), IUCN category VI
, (2007), IUCN category VI
, (2007), IUCN category VI
, (2007), IUCN category VI
, (2007), IUCN category VI

, (2013), IUCN category VI

, (2012), IUCN category VI

, (2012), IUCN category II

, (2013), IUCN category VI
, (2012), IUCN category VI

, (2012), IUCN category VI
, (2012), IUCN category VI

Europe

Finland
Metsäkuohu, (2018), 
Tervapesä, (2018),

Sweden
Småbodarna, (2018), 
Långstrandberget, (2018), 
Björkbergsbacken, (2018), 
Höksberget, (2018),

United Kingdom
Port Erin Bay MNR, Isle of Man, (2018), 
UK Overseas Territories
 Ascension Island,  South Atlantic
 Pitcairn Islands, South Pacific Ocean 
 St Helena, South Atlantic
 South Orkneys, British Antarctic Territory
 South Georgia & the South Sandwich Islands, Southern Atlantic
 Tristan da Cunha, Southern Atlantic

North America

Canada

United States
 , (2010), 
 , (2002), 
 , (2009), IUCN Category V

Oceania

Cook Islands
, (2017), IUCN Category VI.

New Zealand
 , 1981, IUCN Category Ia.
 , 1975, IUCN Category Ia.
 , 2014, IUCN Category Ia.
 , 2014, IUCN Category Ia.
 , 2011, IUCN Category Ia.
 , 1992, IUCN Category Ia.

South America

Chile
Islas Diego Ramírez y Paso Drake, (2019), 
Humedales Costeros de la Bahía Tongoy, (2018),

Ecuador
 , 1998,

Grenada
Grande Anse, (2018),

Areas beyond national jurisdiction

 , 2012, 
 , 2010,

To be integrated

Réserve Naturelle Nationale des Terres australes françaises, (2017) 
, (2006), 
Parc Naturel de la Mer de Corail, (2014), 
Pacific Remote Islands, (2009) 
South Georgia and South Sandwich Islands Marine Protected Area, (2012), 
Pitcairn Islands Marine Reserve, (2016),

References

 
Marine